Robat-e Mian Dasht (also Romanized as Robāţ-e Mīān Dasht and Robāţ-e Meyāndasht; also known as Mīān Dasht) is a village in Pain Rokh Rural District, Jolgeh Rokh District, Torbat-e Heydarieh County, Razavi Khorasan Province, Iran. At the 2006 census, its population was 714, in 161 families.

References 

Populated places in Torbat-e Heydarieh County